The 1960 Ottawa Rough Riders finished in 2nd place in the Interprovincial Rugby Football Union with a 9–5 record and won the Grey Cup.

Preseason

Regular season

Standings

Schedule

Postseason

Playoffs

Grey Cup

Player stats

Passing

Awards and honours
CFL's Most Outstanding Canadian Award – Ron Stewart (RB)
Grey Cup Most Valuable Player – Ron Stewart (RB)

References

Ottawa Rough Riders seasons
James S. Dixon Trophy championship seasons
Grey Cup championship seasons